Kalea Moore (born 27 March 2003) is an English cricketer who currently plays for Kent, South East Stars and Northern Superchargers. An all-rounder, she is a right-arm off break bowler and right-handed batter.

Early life
Moore was born on 27 March 2003 in Greenwich, Greater London. She attended St Lawrence College, Ramsgate.

Domestic career
Moore made her county debut in 2019, for Kent against Yorkshire. That season, she took 4 wickets in the County Championship and 4 wickets in the Twenty20 Cup, helping Kent win their 8th Championship title. In 2021, she was Kent's leading wicket-taker in the Twenty20 Cup with 9 wickets at an average of 15.77, helping her side to win the South East Group. At the end of the season, she was named as Kent's Women's Club Player of the Year. She played eight matches for Kent in the 2022 Women's Twenty20 Cup, taking eight wickets at an average of 20.50.

In 2021, Moore was named as part of the South East Stars squad for their upcoming season. She made her debut for the side in the opening match of the Charlotte Edwards Cup, against Lightning. She went on to play every match in the competition that season, taking 6 wickets at an average of 21.16, as her side won the competition. She also played three matches in the Rachael Heyhoe Flint Trophy, and took four wickets in five matches for Northern Superchargers in The Hundred. In 2022, she played seven matches for South East Stars in the 2022 Charlotte Edwards Cup, scoring 133 runs and taking eight wickets at an average of 8.50. She scored her maiden Twenty20 half-century against Western Storm, making 57*. Moore was again in the Northern Superchargers squad in The Hundred, but missed the competition, and the rest of the season for Stars, due to injury. At the end of the 2022 season, it was announced that Moore had signed her first professional contract with South East Stars.

References

External links

2003 births
Living people
People from Greenwich
Kent women cricketers
South East Stars cricketers
Northern Superchargers cricketers
People educated at St Lawrence College, Ramsgate